Benwood may refer to

Places
Benwood, Indiana
Benwood, West Virginia

Ships
, a Norwegian cargo ship sunk during World War II.
, a British coaster in service 1947-51